New Milford is a census-designated place (CDP) in Litchfield County, Connecticut, United States. It comprises the main population center within the town of New Milford. As of the 2010 census, the population of New Milford was 6,523, out of 28,142 in the entire town of New Milford.

Geography
The New Milford CDP is in the center of the town of New Milford, in the valley of the Housatonic River. The western edge of the CDP follows the Housatonic and a tributary, the East Aspetuck River. The CDP extends north to Paper Mill Road and south to Hine Hill Road, while the eastern edge of the CDP follows Prospect Hill Road (Connecticut Route 67), Mallett Lane, Heacock Crossbrook Road, and Park Lane Road (U.S. Route 202) north to Paper Mill Road.

U.S. Route 202 passes through the center of the community, leading northeast  to Litchfield and south  to Danbury. Route 67 leads southeast out of Milford  to Roxbury.

Demographics
As of the census of 2010, there were 6,523 people, 2,818 households, and 1,563 families residing in the CDP. There were 3,120 housing units, of which 302, or 9.7%, were vacant. The racial makeup of the CDP was 88.7% White, 2.6% African American, 0.4% Native American, 3.1% Asian, 0.03% Native Hawaiian or Pacific Islander, 3.1% some other race, and 2.0% from two or more races. Hispanic or Latino of any race were 8.6% of the population.

Of the 2,818 households in the community, 28.6% had children under the age of 18 living with them, 39.3% were headed by married couples living together, 11.8% had a female householder with no husband present, and 44.5% were non-families. 35.9% of all households were made up of individuals, and 11.1% were someone living alone who was 65 years of age or older. The average household size was 2.28, and the average family size was 3.02.

21.2% of the CDP population were under the age of 18, 7.6% were from 18 to 24, 29.5% were from 25 to 44, 28.1% were from 45 to 64, and 13.7% were 65 years of age or older. The median age was 40.1 years. For every 100 females, there were 93.8 males. For every 100 females age 18 and over, there were 91.8 males.

For the period 2013-17, the estimated median income for a household in the CDP was $57,768, and the median income for a family was $72,786. The per capita income for the CDP was $30,798. 8.6% of families and 11.0% of the total population were living below the poverty line, including 15.6% of people under 18 and 7.5% of those over 64.

References

New Milford, Connecticut
Villages in Litchfield County, Connecticut
Census-designated places in Litchfield County, Connecticut